The Avro Canada CF-103 was a proposed Canadian interceptor, designed by Avro Canada in the early 1950s as a development, and possible replacement of the company's CF-100 Canuck, that was entering service at the time with the Royal Canadian Air Force (RCAF). Although intended to be capable of flying at transonic speeds, the CF-103 only offered a moderate increase in performance and capability over the CF-100; subsequently, the aircraft never progressed beyond the mock-up stage.

Design and development
Even before the prototype of the CF-100 had flown, Avro Canada was conducting studies of potential advanced variations of the aircraft, as the RCAF was seeking an interceptor with greater high-speed performance. Due to the perceived limitations of the CF-100's original "thick", straight wing, Chief Designer John Frost proposed a series of refinements that included a thinner swept wing. In December 1950, the Avro Aircraft Design Office decided to proceed with a redesign, primarily incorporating the early series CF-100 fuselage structure with a new swept wing and tail surfaces as part of the C-100S design study.

Frost considered the new design as an interim aircraft between the CF-100 and the more advanced C-104 project. The salient changes to the basic wing planform were in decreasing its chord and thickness, and adding a 42° sweep to the leading edge, creating a near-delta wing configuration. The tail surfaces were also swept back.  One version that was considered featured two streamlined fuel tanks blended into the leading edge of the wings near the three/quarter position.

Despite the use of more powerful engines, the redesign had very modest performance specifications, with a planned maximum diving speed of Mach 0.95, scarcely better than the placarded Mach 0.85 speed limit of the production CF-100 Mk 2 and Mk 3. Avro executives, recognizing that the company had already suffered due to the protracted development of the CF-100, determined that Frost's revised design would provide a "hedge" against the CF-100's failure to secure long-term contracts.

In 1951, the Canadian Department of Trade and Commerce issued an order for two prototypes and a static test airframe, under the CF-103 project designation. Jigs, tools and detailed engineering drawings were in place by June 1951, with wind tunnel testing, conducted at Cornell University, completed by November 1951. Although a wooden mock-up of the CF-103 was built, along with a separate cockpit area and engine section that was partially framed in, the mock-up did not feature an undercarriage unit nor any interior fittings. Two different tail designs were fitted with the initial effort only having a swept leading edge of the tail, while the definitive version had a much more raked appearance. The engineering and installation requirements for the CF-103's proposed Orenda 17 jet engines were not finalized, as the experimental "hybrid" using an Orenda 8 compressor unit and Orenda 11 two-stage turbine, matched to a "reheat" unit, had not been fully developed.

Cancellation
During 1951, flight tests carried out by Chief Development Test Pilot S/L Janusz Żurakowski and other members of the Flight Test unit,  revealed the development potential of the CF-100 had outstripped the intended performance envelope of the CF-103, while Frost and the Design Office became preoccupied with more sophisticated designs as potential replacements for the CF-100.   Work on the CF-103 stalled, with the maiden flight originally scheduled for the summer of 1952, postponed to mid-1953. With Cold War pressures mounting, the Canadian government demanded that production of the latest CF-100 fighter, as well as developing more advanced variants of the Canuck should predominate, leading the Avro company to curtail the moribund CF-103 project in December 1951. 

Although the mock-up languished in the experimental bay at the factory, a dramatic event served to preclude any attempt to restart the project. On 18 December 1952, from a height of 33,000 ft (10,000 m), Żurakowski dived the CF-100 Mk 4 prototype (RCAF Serial No. 18112) to Mach 1.06. His "unauthorized" test flight resulted in the final scrapping of the mock-up.

Specifications

See also

References
Notes

Citations

Bibliography

 Campagna, Palmiro. Requiem for a Giant: A.V. Roe Canada and the Avro Arrow. Toronto: Dundurn Press, 2003. .
 Milberry, Larry. The Avro CF-100. Toronto: CANAV Books, 1981. .
 Milberry, Larry. Sixty Years: The RCAF and CF Air Command 1924-1984. Toronto: CANAV Books, 1984. .
 Page, Ron. Canuck: CF-100 All Weather Fighter. Erin, Ontario: Boston Mills Press, 1981. .
 Page, Ron, Richard Organ, Don Watson and Les Wilkinson ("The Arrowheads"). Avro Arrow: The Story of the Avro Arrow from its Evolution to its Extinction. Erin, Ontario: Boston Mills Press, 1979, reprinted Stoddart, 2004. .
 Stewart, Greig. Shutting Down the National Dream: A.V. Roe and the Tragedy of the Avro Arrow. Toronto: McGraw-Hill-Ryerson, 1991. .
 Valiquette, Marc-Andre. Destruction of a Dream: The Tragedy of Avro Canada and the CF-105 Arrow, Volume 1. Montreal: Marc-Andre Valiquette (self-published), 2009. .
 Zuk, Bill. Avrocar, Canada's Flying Saucer: The Story Of Avro Canada's Secret Projects. Erin, Ontario: Boston Mills Press, 2001. .
 Zuk, Bill. Janusz Zurakowski: Legends in the Sky. St. Catharine's, Ontario: Vanwell, 2004. .

External links

 CF-103
 "CF-103 Canuck II" (sic)

Abandoned military aircraft projects of Canada
CF-103
Twinjets
1950s Canadian fighter aircraft